Bilgram-Mallanwan is a constituency of the Uttar Pradesh Legislative Assembly covering the city of Bilgram & Mallanwan in the Hardoi district of Uttar Pradesh, India.
Bilgram-Mallanwan is one of five assembly constituencies in the Misrikh Lok Sabha constituency. Since 2008, this assembly constituency is numbered 159 amongst 403 constituencies. This place is famously controversial in its region.

Election results

2022

2017

In 2017, Bharatiya Janata Party candidate Ashish Kumar Singh won in 2017 Uttar Pradesh Legislative Assembly election defeating Samajwadi Party candidate Subhash Pal by a margin of 8,025 votes.

References

External links
 

Assembly constituencies of Uttar Pradesh
Politics of Hardoi district